List of West German films of 1954. This was the fifth full year of film production since the formal partition of Germany into East and West in 1949. Major production centres were gathered in Hamburg, Munich and West Berlin. A separate East German film industry controlled by DEFA operated in East Berlin.

A–K

L–Z

Bibliography 
 Davidson, John & Hake, Sabine. Framing the Fifties: Cinema in a Divided Germany. Berghahn Books, 2007.
 Fehrenbach, Heide. Cinema in Democratizing Germany: Reconstructing National Identity After Hitler. University of North Carolina Press, 1995.

See also
 List of Austrian films of 1954
 List of East German films of 1954

External links 
 filmportal.de listing for films made in 1954

West German
Lists of German films
film